3,4-Dimethoxyphenethylamine (DMPEA) is a chemical compound of the phenethylamine class. It is an analogue of the major human neurotransmitter dopamine where the 3- and 4-position hydroxy groups have been replaced with methoxy groups. It is also closely related to mescaline which is 3,4,5-trimethoxyphenethylamine.

Chemistry
One of the earliest syntheses of DMPEA (then referred to as "homoveratrylamine") was that of Pictet and Finkelstein, who made it in a multi-step sequence starting from vanillin. A similar sequence was subsequently reported by Buck and Perkin, as follows:

3,4-Dimethoxybenzaldehyde (veratraldehyde) → 3,4-Dimethoxycinnamic acid → 3,4-Dimethoxyphenylpropionic acid → 3,4-Dimethoxyphenylpropionamide → 3,4-Dimethoxyphenethylamine

A much shorter synthesis is given by Shulgin and Shulgin:

Derivatives
A known use was in the synthesis of Bevantolol.

Pharmacology
DMPEA has some activity as a monoamine oxidase inhibitor.

Occurrence
DMPEA occurs naturally along with mescaline in various species of cacti such as San Pedro and Peruvian Torch.

See also 
 3-Methoxytyramine
 Mescaline

References

External links 
 DMPEA Entry in PiHKAL
 DMPEA Entry in PiHKAL • info

Phenethylamine alkaloids
Catechol ethers